Among the Stars is a 1994 solo album by Mike Pinder of The Moody Blues. It was reissued on CD in August 2013.

Track listing
All tracks composed by Mike Pinder
 "The Power of Love (Can Survive)"
 "You Can't Take Love Away"
 "The Best Things in Life"
 "Hurry On Home"
 "When You're Sleeping"
 "Fantasy Flight"
 "Among the Stars"
 "Upside Down"
 "Waters Beneath the Bridge"
 "The World Today"

The 2013 CD reissue of the album has three bonus tracks:

 "If She Came Back"
 "Waves Crash"
 "Empty Streets"

Personnel
Mike Pinder - synthesizer, acoustic guitar, 12-string guitar, piano, Mellotron, vocals
Michael Sembello, Roland Bautista, Tony Berg - guitar
Alphonso Johnson, Dan Pinder, Fred Beckmeier, Matt Pinder - bass
Alan Pasqua - piano, synthesizer
Adam Sanders, Chester Thompson, Michael Beono, Sam Plersky - drums
Steve Forman - percussion
David Woodford - saxophone
Abe Most - clarinet
Osamu Kitajima - koto
Eddie Ulibarri, Joe Bithorn, Joey Curatolo, Samsara, The Valentine Brothers - backing vocals
Technical
Tony Berg - associate producer
Richard Kaplan - engineer

References

1994 albums
Mike Pinder albums
albums produced by Tony Berg